Moon of the Chaos Eclipse is the fifth album by Runemagick. It was released as a limited edition digipak of 1000 copies in 2002 through Aftermath Music.

Track listing
  "Open the Gateway" – 0:53  
  "Grand Sabbath Pact" – 5:32  
  "Revolution of the Dead" – 6:15  
  "Nocturnal Shrine" – 2:26  
  "Dark Deeds of Temptation" – 5:43  
  "Witch of the Purple Moon" – 3:36  
  "Moon of the Chaos Eclipse" – 4:04  
  "Upon the Red Thrones" – 5:46  
  "The Necro Ambassador" – 5:28  
  "Hymn to the Northern Fire" – 2:06  
  "Goddess of Protection" – 4:16  
  "Mibeg II" – 3:00  
  "On Chariots to Hades" – 19:00  (remix containing silence)

Credits
 Nicklas "Terror" Rudolfsson - Vocals, Guitar
 Emma Karlsson - Bass
 Daniel Moilanen - Drums

Runemagick albums
2002 albums